Freedom is an unincorporated community in Frontier County, Nebraska, United States.

History
A post office was established at Freedom in 1895, and operated intermittently until being discontinued in 1946. Freedom was likely named from the patriotic spirit of the post-Civil War era.

A specimen of prehistoric Amebelodon was found in 1928 on a farm at Freedom.

References

Unincorporated communities in Frontier County, Nebraska
Unincorporated communities in Nebraska